Darko Cingesar (born 25 July 1990) is a Slovenian handball player who plays for RD Urbanscape Loka and the Slovenian national team.

He competed at the 2016 European Men's Handball Championship.

References

External links

1990 births
Living people
Handball players from Ljubljana
Slovenian male handball players
Expatriate handball players
RK Zagreb players
Slovenian expatriate sportspeople in Croatia
Slovenian expatriate sportspeople in France
Olympic handball players of Slovenia
Handball players at the 2016 Summer Olympics